The Brest trials were among the most famous trials conducted under the Second Polish Republic. Lasting from 26 October 1931 to 13 January 1932, they were held at the Warsaw Regional Court where leaders of the Centrolew, a "Center-Left" anti-Sanation-government political-opposition movement, were tried.

Overview
The Polish Sanation government had invalidated the May 1930 election results by disbanding the parliament in August and with increasing pressure on the opposition started a new campaign, the new elections being scheduled for November. Using anti-government demonstrations as a pretext, 20 members of the opposition, including most of the leaders of the Centrolew alliance (from Polish Socialist Party, Polish People's Party "Piast" and Polish People's Party "Wyzwolenie") were arrested in September without a warrant, only strictly on the order of Józef Piłsudski and the then Minister of Internal Security, Felicjan Sławoj Składkowski, accusing them of plotting an anti-government coup. 

The opposition members (who included the former prime minister Wincenty Witos, and Wojciech Korfanty) were imprisoned in the Brest Fortress, where their trial took place (thus the popular name for the election: the 'Brest election'). A number of less known activists were also arrested throughout the country. They were released after the end of the election in the same month. The Brest trial ended in January 1932, with 10 accused receiving sentences up to three years of imprisonment; the appeals of 1933 confirmed the sentences. The government however gave the accused the choice of emigrating: five of them did so, the other five stayed on in Poland to serve the prison term instead.

References

External links

Legal history of Poland
Trials in Poland
Trials
Political and cultural purges
1931 in Poland
1932 in Poland